Naked Songs – Live and Acoustic is an album by the American singer–songwriter Rickie Lee Jones, released in October 1995 via Reprise Records. It reached No. 121 on The Billboard 200.

Track listing 
All tracks composed by Rickie Lee Jones; except where indicated

 "The Horses" (Jones, Walter Becker)
 "Weasel and the White Boys Cool" (Jones, Alfred Johnson)
 "Altar Boy"
 "It Must Be Love"
 "Young Blood"
 "The Last Chance Texaco"
 "Skeletons"
 "Magazine"
 "Living It Up"
 "We Belong Together"
 "Coolsville"
 "Flying Cowboys" (Jones, Sal Bernardi, Pascal Nabet Meyer)
 "Stewart's Coat"
 "Chuck E.'s in Love"
 "Autumn Leaves" (Johnny Mercer, Jacques Prévert, Joseph Kosma)

Personnel 
 Rickie Lee Jones – vocals, acoustic guitar, piano
 Rob Wasserman – bass on "Chuck E's in Love" and "Autumn Leaves"
Technical
Dan Kasting, Derek Featherstone - live recording engineers
John Beverly Jones, Mark Linett, Steve Boyer - mixing
Lee Cantelon - art direction, design, photography

References 

Rickie Lee Jones albums
Albums produced by Russ Titelman
1995 live albums
Reprise Records live albums